Yann Ekra (born 10 December 1990) is a professional footballer who plays as a forward for the Tampa Bay Rowdies of the USL Championship. Born in Ivory Coast, he is a former France youth international.

Club career

Lyon
Ekra began his youth career with Esperance Paris 19ème at the age of 11. He joined Lyon at the age of 12. His roommate for several years was Karim Benzema. Ekra played two games and scored one goal for Lyon's reserve team in the 2007–08 season.

Hull City
Ekra signed with Hull City at the beginning of the 2008–09 season. In the 2009–10 season, he played 7 games for the reserve team, but did not score.

To further his career, Ekra joined Greek side Panionios on loan in January 2009 until the end of the season. He played for the club's under-21 side. He did not play any first team games although he made the gameday roster in a Super League Greece game in which Panionios beat Asteras Tripoli 4–3 on 26 April 2009.

On 29 May 2010, Ekra was released by Hull.

Châteauroux
For the 2010–11 and 2011–12 seasons, Ekra played in France on the reserve team of Châteauroux.

Harrisburg City Islanders
While visiting his in-laws in Washington D.C. in the Spring of 2012, Ekra attended an open tryout with Harrisburg City Islanders of USL Pro. Following a strong performance in preseason scrimmages in which Ekra scored three goals in three games,  he signed with the team. He made his debut on 4 May 2012 in 2–1 loss to the Charlotte Eagles. In his first start on 19 May 2012 against Dayton Dutch Lions, Ekra scored a hat trick on his first three shots. In the 2012 regular season, he played 21 regular season games - scoring 6 goals and assisting on 1 goal. He also played 3 U.S. Open Cup games - scoring 1 goal and assisting on 3 goals. He also played in one playoff game. In the 2013 regular season, he played 24 regular season games - scoring 4 goals and assisting on 3 goals. He also played in one playoff game and one U.S. Open Cup game.

After the 2012 season, Ekra trialed with D.C. United of Major League Soccer.

Harrisburg Heat (Indoor)
In 2012–13, Ekra played his first season of indoor soccer with the Harrisburg Heat of the Professional Arena Soccer League. He made his debut on 3 November 2012 in a 6–2 loss to the Dallas Sidekicks. His most productive performance was a 2 goal, 3 assist performance in a 10–8 loss against the Chicago Mustangs. He finished the season playing 11 games, scoring 7 goals and assisting on 8 goals.

Philadelphia Union
On 13 September 2013, Ekra signed with the Philadelphia Union of Major League Soccer. In 2012, Ekra had been productive against Philadelphia - scoring a goal in a 12 June 2012 friendly in which Harrisburg City Islanders won, getting 2 assists in a 26 June 2012 5–2 U.S. Open Cup loss to the Union as well as playing as a guest player and assisting on the only goal in a D.C. United 1–0 reserve league win over the Union on 12 October 2012. He did not appear for the club and was released at the end of the 2013 season.

Return to Harrisburg City Islanders
In March 2014, Ekra returned to Harrisburg City Islanders.

Charlotte Independence
Ekra signed with the Charlotte Independence in December 2015.

Tampa Bay Rowdies
On 7 December 2018, Ekra moved to the Tampa Bay Rowdies of the USL Championship ahead of their 2019 season.

International career
Ekra played on national youth teams for France at the U15, U16, U17 and U18 levels. He played on the U17 team that won the Disney Soccer Showcase in 2005.

References

External links
 
 
 
  
 Tabelepilkarskie profile
Yann Ekra at USL Championship

1990 births
Living people
Footballers from Abidjan
Ivorian footballers
French footballers
Ivorian emigrants to France
France youth international footballers
Association football forwards
Olympique Lyonnais players
Hull City A.F.C. players
Panionios F.C. players
LB Châteauroux players
Penn FC players
Harrisburg Heat (MASL) players
Philadelphia Union players
Charlotte Independence players
Tampa Bay Rowdies players
Championnat National 2 players
Championnat National 3 players
USL Championship players
Professional Arena Soccer League players
Ivorian expatriate footballers
French expatriate footballers
Expatriate footballers in England
Expatriate footballers in Greece
Expatriate soccer players in the United States
Ivorian expatriate sportspeople in England
Ivorian expatriate sportspeople in Greece
Ivorian expatriate sportspeople in the United States
French expatriate sportspeople in England
French expatriate sportspeople in Greece
French expatriate sportspeople in the United States